Abdallah ibn al-Fadl al-Antaki was an Arab Orthodox translator and theologian active in Antioch during the middle of the eleventh century, during a period of renewed Byzantine rule over the city.  He was responsible for a large number of patristic translations, as well as original theological and philosophical works.

Little is known of his life, apart from what can be gleaned from manuscripts of his texts.  He was a deacon and the grandson of a bishop.  He received an excellent education in both Arabic and Greek, having studied Arabic grammar with the famous poet Abul ʿAla Al-Maʿarri.  Several of his works and translations were commissioned by notables from Antioch and neighbouring cities in Muslim territory. He translated the Loci communes, a Greek florilegium.

His psalms were used in the first printed Arabic book, the Kitab salat al-sawai.

Works
 The Book of Benefit (Kitab al-Manfa‘a)
 Discourse on the Holy Trinity (Kalam fi l-lahut)
 Book of the Joy of the Believer (Kitab Bahjat al-Mu'min)
 Exposition of the Orthodox Faith (Sharh al-Amana al-Mustaqima wa-Ibanat Ghalat al-Ya'aqiba wa-l-Nastur 'Ala Sabil al-Ijaz)
 Questions and Responses on the Trinity and the Incarnation (Masa'il wa-Ajwiba hawla al-Tathlith wa-l-Ittihad)

References
This article contains text from the OrthodoxWiki which is released under a Creative Commons license compatible with Wikipedia.

Further reading
 Treiger, Alexander. "ʿAbdallāh ibn al-Faḍl al-Anṭākī." In Christian-Muslim Relations: A Bibliographical History, vol. 3, ed. David Thomas, Barbara Roggema, and Alex Mallett, 89–113. Leiden: Brill, 2011. Academia.edu  
 Roberts, Alexandre M. Reason and Revelation in Byzantine Antioch: The Christian Translation Program of Abdallah ibn al-Fadl. Oakland: University of California Press, 2020. 

11th-century Arabic writers
11th-century Byzantine people
Translators from Greek
Translators to Arabic
Deacons
Arabic-language writers